Burning the Wind is a 1928 American romantic drama film, directed by Herbert Blaché and Henry MacRae, starring Hoot Gibson and featuring Boris Karloff. The film is considered to be lost.

Plot

Cast
 Hoot Gibson as Richard Gordon Jr.
 Virginia Brown Faire as Maria Valdez
 Cesare Gravina as Don Ramón Valdez
 Boris Karloff as Pug Doran
 Gilbert Holmes as Peewee (credited as Pee Wee Holmes)
 Robert Homans as Richard Gordon Sr.
 George Grandee as Manuel Valdez

See also
 Hoot Gibson filmography
 Boris Karloff filmography

References

External links

1928 films
1928 lost films
American black-and-white films
American romantic drama films
American silent feature films
Films directed by Herbert Blaché
Films directed by Henry MacRae
Lost American films
Universal Pictures films
1928 romantic drama films
Films with screenplays by George H. Plympton
1920s American films
Silent romantic drama films
Silent American drama films